Grindsted Speedway Klub is a speedway club, based at the Billund Municipality Stadium, north of Grindsted in Denmark, who compete in the Danish Speedway League.

History
The club was founded in 1985. 
 
The team have never won the Danish Speedway League but have spent numerous seasons in the highest league tier.

Teams

2022 team

References 

Danish speedway teams